Helgo, Helgø or Helgö may refer to:

People
 Helgo Zettervall (1831–1907), Swedish architect and professor
 Christine Sagen Helgø (born 1968), Norwegian politician, mayor of Stavanger
 Malene Helgø (born 1999), Norwegian tennis player

Other uses
 Helgo, alternate spelling of Halga, a legendary Danish king
 Helgö, an island in Ekerö Municipality, Stockholm County, Sweden
 Helgø, full name Helgø Matsenter, a Norwegian supermarket chain

See also
 Helge (disambiguation)